727 Nipponia is a minor planet orbiting the Sun. It is a member of the Maria family of asteroids.

Nipponia was originally discovered by Shin Hirayama in Tokyo on March 6, 1900.  However, he was not able to determine its orbit.  After it was rediscovered by Adam Massinger on February 11, 1912, Massinger gave the honor of naming it to Hirayama, who chose to name it from a latinization of "Nippon" (Japan in Japanese). Massinger, however, remains the officially credited discoverer of Nipponia.

References

External links 
 
 

Maria asteroids
Nipponia
Nipponia
Nipponia
DT-type asteroids (Tholen)
19120211